Mourning Sun, released in November 2005, is the fifth studio album (although it is fourth 'official' studio album) by Fields of the Nephilim.

Vocalist Carl McCoy is the only original band member to be featured on this album.
McCoy along with  John "Capachino" Carter (original Nefilim collaborator) spent eighteen months recording new demos in McCoy's mobile recording studio, dubbed "The Ice Cage" which took them to various places, including Norway. According to McCoy, Ice Cage sessions generated enough material for a double album, yet it was ultimately decided to narrow the track listing down to one disc.
While McCoy has suggested that additional musicians were recruited for the recording process, the only identified persons involved in the writing and recording process to date are John "Capachino" Carter (a musician who also worked with McCoy on Zoon demos in the beginning of 1990's) and McCoy's daughters Scarlett and Eden on backing vocals for the title track. McCoy has admitted to having applied preprogrammed drums on some of the tracks, stressing at the same time that most of the drum parts "were created by a real human being - Carter."

Track listing

Reception

Reception to the new album was generally positive, with even the NME listing no less than six of the album's tracks amongst their Top 10 for the band's best songs to date.

Personnel
 Carl McCoy - vocals, keys, producer
 John "Capachino" Carter - bass guitar, guitars, drums, keys & backing vocals
 Scarlett McCoy - backing vocals on "Mourning Sun"
 Eden McCoy - backing vocals on "Mourning Sun"

References

External links
 

Fields of the Nephilim albums
2005 albums
SPV/Steamhammer albums